Russky Sever National Park is a national park in the north of Russia, located in Kirillovsky District of Vologda Oblast. It was established on March 20, 1992. The name of the park means Russian North in Russian. The park protects natural and cultural landscapes around Kirillo-Belozersky Monastery and Ferapontov Monastery, places of great historical significance.

History
In the 13th century, the area was part of the Principality of Beloozero, and in the 14th century, together with the principality, entered the Grand Duchy of Moscow. In 1397, St. Cyril of White Lake, a monk and a disciple of St. Sergius of Radonezh, founded the Kirillo-Belozersky monastery on the shore of Lake Siverskoye. The town of Kirillov eventually developed as the posad of the monastery. In 1398, St. Therapont of White Lake, who arrived with Cyril, moved to a separate location, which later became the Ferapontov Monastery. Both monasteries were subordinate to Archbishops of Rostov. In the 15th and the 16th century, Kirillo-Belozersky monastery developed into one of the most influential monasteries in Russia. It also helped that the Sheksna River was one of the most heavily used waterways connecting central and northern Russia. At some point, it was the second biggest landowner after the Trinity Lavra of St. Sergius. Vasili III of Russia, the Grand Prince of Moscow, and Ivan the Terrible, the Tsar, visited the monastery on several occasions. All these monasteries are currently located within the limits of the park.

In 1980s, the concept of national parks, which did not previously exist in Soviet Union, was developed, and Vologda Oblast was asked to create one national park. Whereas the initial choice was to create the park in Vytegorsky District in the northwest of the oblast, to protect its karst landscapes, the area was finally decided to be too remote for mass tourism, and the location of the park was moved to Kirillovsky District. The project of the park was developed in 1989-1990, and the national park was established in 1992.

Location and geography
Only 45.6% of the area of the park actually belong to the park. Any activity related to production is prohibited in this part of the park. The rest of the park has not been alienated and is in use, mostly as agricultural lands. In particular, the town of Kirillov is located within the park. The national park also includes Kirillo-Belozyorsky, Ferapontov, and Goritsky Monasteries, as well as stretches of the Northern Dvina Canal and the Volga–Baltic Waterway.

Woods occupy 69.8% of the park area, swamps additionally occupy 7.1%. Most of the area is essentially hilly landscapes of glacial origin. Several hills, such as Maura Hill, Sandyreva Hill, and Tsypina Hill, are protected as natural monuments. There are two more protected natural monuments. Sokolsky Bor is an area covered by pinewood forest and located on the bank of the Sheksna Reservoir. Shalgo-Bodunovsky Les is a forested area with limited access which protects the remains of spruce and pine pristine forest which is almost extinct in Vologda Oblast.

Tourism
The town of Kirillov with the Kirillo-Belozersky Monastery, as well as the Ferapontov and the Goritsky Monasteries are acclaimed tourist attractions located within the limits of the park. The Ferapontov Monastery has been recognized in 2000 as a World Heritage site. All these attractions are accessible by roads. In particular, the paved roads between Vologda and Kirillov, and between Vologda and Vytegra cross the area of the park.

References

External links 

 
 

Geography of Vologda Oblast
National parks of Russia
Protected areas established in 1992
Tourist attractions in Vologda Oblast
1992 establishments in Russia